Eugenio Esteban Mena Reveco (born 18 July 1988) is a Chilean professional footballer who plays as a left-back for Argentine Primera División side Racing Club and the Chile national team.

Club career
Mena finished his formation in Santiago Wanderers' academy, and made his senior debuts in 2008 Chilean Primera División B. He scored his first professional goal on 11 October 2009, against San Marcos de Arica.

In July 2010, Mena signed with Club Universidad de Chile, for a $500,000 fee for the half of his rights. In his first season, Mena failed to break into a settled squad, appearing rarely. However, after the arrival of Jorge Sampaoli in 2011, Mena was converted into an important player of the La U squad. At the end of the season, he was a part of the squad which won Copa Sudamericana and Chilean Primera División.

On 3 July 2013, Mena signed a one-year loan deal with Brazilian Série A outfit Santos FC, with a buyout clause. He quickly established himself as a starter, and on 5 June of the following year Peixe bought the remaining rights of the player.

On 14 January 2015 Mena rescinded his contract Santos, after winning a court case due to unpaid wages. Ten days later he agreed a deal with fellow league team Cruzeiro.

On 9 July 2018, he joined Racing Club de Avellaneda.

International career
Mena represented Chile national football team U-23 on 2009 Toulon Tournament that finished first, and 2010 Toulon Tournament that finished fourth.

On 7 September 2010, he made his debut with the full squad, in a 1–2 defeat against Ukraine. On 21 March 2012, he scored his first goal for La Roja, in a 3–1 win against Peru.

Mena was also one of the 23-men selected by manager Jorge Sampaoli for the 2014 FIFA World Cup. He appeared in four matches during the tournament, all as a starter.

Career statistics

Club
(Correct )

International Goals

''As of match played on 24 June 2021.

Honours

Club
Universidad de Chile
 Primera División de Chile (3): 2011–A, 2011–C, 2012–A
 Copa Sudamericana (1): 2011
 Copa Chile (1): 2012–13

Racing
 Superliga Argentina (1): 2018–19
 Trofeo de Campeones de la Superliga Argentina (1): 2019

International
Chile
 Copa América: 2015
 Copa América Centenario: 2016
 FIFA Confederations Cup: Runner-up 2017

Individual
 Valparaíso UNESCO Medal, World Heritage: 2009
 South American team of year: 2012
 Chilean league team of year: 2012
 Best full back of SIFUP: 2012

References

External links
 
 Eugenio Mena at Goal.com 

1988 births
Living people
Sportspeople from Viña del Mar
Chilean footballers
Chilean expatriate footballers
Chile international footballers
Chile youth international footballers
Association football defenders
Santiago Wanderers footballers
Universidad de Chile footballers
Chilean Primera División players
Santos FC players
Cruzeiro Esporte Clube players
São Paulo FC players
Sport Club do Recife players
Esporte Clube Bahia players
Campeonato Brasileiro Série A players
Racing Club de Avellaneda footballers
Argentine Primera División players
Chilean expatriate sportspeople in Brazil
Expatriate footballers in Brazil
Chilean expatriate sportspeople in Argentina
Expatriate footballers in Argentina
2014 FIFA World Cup players
2015 Copa América players
Copa América Centenario players
2017 FIFA Confederations Cup players
2021 Copa América players
Copa América-winning players